Henry Joseph Rudolph  (1902–1984) was a notable New Zealand watch repairer, musician, choirmaster and music director. He was born in London, England, in 1902.

In the 1974 New Year Honours, Rudolph was appointed a Member of the Order of the British Empire, for services to music and welfare.

References

1902 births
1984 deaths
English emigrants to New Zealand
Watch technicians
20th-century New Zealand male singers
New Zealand Members of the Order of the British Empire